12 Songs is the second album by American singer-songwriter Randy Newman, released in April 1970 by Reprise Records. It features a swampy style of roots music with introspective, satirical songwriting. "Have You Seen My Baby?", the album's only single, was released in May.

When 12 Songs was first released, it was well received and has since garnered retrospective acclaim from critics such as Robert Christgau and Rolling Stone, both of whom cite it as one of the best albums of all time.

Music and lyrics 
According to Q magazine, 12 Songs demonstrated Newman's eccentric mix of traditional pop song structures and his sardonic, satirical humor. AllMusic's Mark Deming said although his sense of humor seemed more caustic than on his self-titled debut album, Newman's "most mordant character studies" on 12 Songs "boast a recognizable humanity, which often make his subjects both pitiable and all the more loathsome." In the opinion of Robert Christgau, American songwriting in general is often "banal, prolix, and virtually solipsistic when it wants to be honest, merely banal when it doesn't", but Newman's truisms on the album are "always concise, never confessional", and unique:

As with all of Newman's early albums, several of its songs had been previously recorded by other artists.  In this case, "Mama Told Me Not To Come" had originally been recorded in 1967 by Eric Burdon, and that same year The Beau Brummels released their version of "My Old Kentucky Home".  Three other songs originally appeared in versions by other artists just a few months prior to the LP release of 12 Songs: "Yellow Man" by Harry Nilsson on his February, 1970 album Nilsson Sings Newman; "Have You Seen My Baby" by Fats Domino (as a 1969 single); and "Let's Burn Down The Cornfield" by Lou Rawls (the b-side to his 1970 R&B hit "You've Made Me So Very Happy").

Critical reception 

12 Songs received positive reviews from contemporary critics. According to Keith Phipps from The A.V. Club, Newman "began to gather a following beyond critics and fellow songwriters" with the album. Rolling Stone magazine's Bruce Grimes gave it a rave review when it was released, hailing the album as "the full emergence of a leading innovator in rock and roll". In The Village Voice, Christgau called it the best record of 1970, finding the songwriting, production, and performances superior and "more accessible than the great-but-weird album that preceded it".

Years later in Christgau's Record Guide: Rock Albums of the Seventies (1981), Christgau called 12 Songs "a perfect album". Deming later said it was Newman's "first great album, and ... still one of his finest moments on record." Yahoo! Music's Dave DiMartino observed some of Newman's "best-known earlier material" on the album, which he felt featured "a stellar trio of guitarists, including Ry Cooder, Clarence White and (Beau Brummels) Ron Elliott." Mojo commended Newman for replacing "the orchestra with an Americana rock rhythm section", while writing that "the more conventional presentation found Newman a college audience attuned to his wry singularity".

In 2000 it was voted number 691 in Colin Larkin's All Time Top 1000 Albums.

In 2003, 12 Songs was ranked number 354 on Rolling Stones list of the 500 greatest albums of all time, and at 356 in a 2012 revised list. Rob Sheffield, writing in The Rolling Stone Album Guide (2004), cited it as the moment "where Newman got loose as a rock & roller, ditching the complex orchestrations for a bluesy, easy-swinging satire of America".

Track listing
All songs written by Randy Newman except where noted.

Side one
"Have You Seen My Baby?" – 2:32
"Let's Burn Down the Cornfield" – 3:03
"Mama Told Me Not to Come" – 2:12
"Suzanne" – 3:15
"Lover's Prayer" – 1:55
"Lucinda" – 2:40
"Underneath the Harlem Moon" (Mack Gordon, Harry Revel) – 1:52

Side two
"Yellow Man" – 2:19
"Old Kentucky Home" – 2:40
"Rosemary" – 2:08
"If You Need Oil" – 3:00
"Uncle Bob's Midnight Blues" – 2:15

Personnel
Musicians 
Randy Newman – vocals, piano
Clarence White – lead guitar, B-Bender electric guitar
Ron Elliott – rhythm guitar
Ry Cooder – slide guitar
Lyle Ritz – bass guitar, double bass
Jim Gordon, Gene Parsons – drums
Roy Harte, Milt Holland – percussion
Al McKibbon – double bass

Production 
Lenny Waronker – producer
Jack Nitzsche – co-producer on "Let's Burn Down the Cornfield"
Doug Botnick – engineer
Lee Herschberg – engineer
Ed Thrasher – artwork
Tony Newman – cover photography

References

Bibliography

Further reading

External links 
 
 

1970 albums
Randy Newman albums
Albums produced by Lenny Waronker
Albums produced by Jack Nitzsche
Reprise Records albums